Oumar N'Diaye may refer to:

Oumar N'Diaye (footballer born 1985), French-Mauritanian football player
Oumar N'Diaye (footballer born 1988), Mauritanian football player